The Heatmakerz is a hip-hop production started by Rsonist (Gregory Green) originally from Kingston, Jamaica, now living in New York. The duo, consisting of Rsonist (Gregory Green) and Thrilla (Sean Thomas), rose to fame after providing beats to various releases of the Diplomats. The bulk of albums like Diplomatic Immunity and Juelz Santana's debut From Me to U were produced by the Heatmakerz. Their production style is based upon high pitched soul samples.  To this day, the Heatmakerz still use the same style of production. Timothy Hodge made an appearance on Beat Bangerz alongside Rsonist.

Production discography

Notes

References

External links 
 iStandard Exclusive Audio iNterview w/ Rsonist of the Heatmakerz
 iStandardProducers.com iSitdown w/ Rsonist of The Heatmakerz
 MySpace profile
 AllHipHop interview
 nobodysmiling.com interview
 Rsonist Video Interview on JumpOff.TV

American hip hop record producers
The Diplomats
Living people
Record production duos
Year of birth missing (living people)
American songwriting teams